Tested is a live album by punk rock band Bad Religion. It was recorded in the USA, Canada, Germany, Estonia, Denmark, Italy and Austria, in 1996, and released in 1997. It is Bad Religion's second live album. Instead of using crowd microphones and mobile studios like most live albums, the band tapped the inputs, for a result that portrays Bad Religion's live sound without crowd noise. It also includes three new songs; "Dream of Unity," "It's Reciprocal," and the title track.

Critical reception
Dave Thompson, in Alternative Rock, wrote: "Disconcerting the first listen, energizing thereafter, few live albums have been this brave."

Track listing

Personnel
 Greg Graffin - vocals
 Brian Baker - guitar, backing vocals
 Greg Hetson - guitar
 Jay Bentley - bass guitar, backing vocals
 Bobby Schayer - drums
 Ronnie Kimball - production

Notes/trivia
 The songs "Tested", "Dream of Unity" and "It's Reciprocal" are previously unreleased studio tracks.
 The live songs were recorded in Berlin (Germany), Rome (Italy), Roskilde (Denmark), Pittsburgh (PA, USA), Loreley (Germany), Melbourne (FL, USA), Toronto (Ontario, Canada), Dortmund (Germany), Detroit (MI, USA), Berlin (Germany), New York (NY, USA), Ithaca (NY, USA), Raleigh (NC, USA), Munich (Germany), Tallinn (Estonia), Baltimore (MD, USA), Vancouver (British Columbia, Canada), Chicago (IL, USA), San Francisco (CA, USA), Jacksonville (FL, USA) and Montreal (Quebec, Canada)
 The disc has the phrase "No Bad Religion song can make your live complete" printed on it - a slightly modified quote from the song No Direction, in which the lyric is “life” instead of “live”.

References

External links

Tested at YouTube (streamed copy where licensed)

Bad Religion live albums
1997 live albums
Epic Records live albums